Elysia is a genus of sea slugs, marine gastropod molluscs in the family Plakobranchidae. These animals are colorful sea slugs, and they can superficially resemble nudibranchs, but are not very closely related to them. Instead they are sacoglossans, commonly known as sap-sucking slugs.

Elysia sea slugs graze on algae and some species such as E. viridis and E. chlorotica hijack the chloroplasts for themselves. The chloroplasts end up lining the slug’s digestive tract, enabling the slugs to survive solely by photosynthesis for several months at a time. This association is crucial for the development and maturing of the slug. Exactly how the slugs use the chloroplasts is unclear, as many of the proteins used by chloroplasts are encoded in the genome of the host cell. These proteins, numbering in the hundreds, are manufactured in the cell’s nucleus, and then moved into the chloroplast, enabling it to survive.

Young specimens of E. atroviridis  and E. marginata became known for their ability to regenerate the whole body from a severed head. This autotomy expels internal parasites.

This genus was previously sometimes considered to be in the family Stiligeridae, and was also previously placed in the family Elysiidae.

Species
The following species are recognised in the genus Elysia:

Elysia abei 
Elysia amakusana 
Elysia amuravela 
Elysia annedupontae 
Elysia aowthai 
Elysia arena 
Elysia asbecki 
Elysia atroviridis 
Elysia australis 
Elysia babai 
Elysia bangtawaensis 
Elysia bella 
Elysia bengalensis 
Elysia bennettae 
Elysia brycei 
Elysia buonoi 
Elysia canguzua 
Elysia catulus 
Elysia chavelavargas 
Elysia chilkensis 
Elysia chlorotica 
Elysia christinae 
Elysia coodgeensis 
Elysia cornigera 
Elysia crispata 
Elysia deborahae 
Elysia degeneri 
Elysia delcarmen 
Elysia diomedea 
Elysia ellenae 
Elysia entredosaguas 
Elysia evelinae 
Elysia expansa 
Elysia faustula 
Elysia filicauda 
Elysia flava 
Elysia flavipunctata 
Elysia flavomacula 
Elysia frankenstein 
Elysia furvacauda 
Elysia grandifolia 
Elysia grandis 
Elysia hamatanii 
Elysia hedgpethi 
Elysia hendersoni 
Elysia hetta 
Elysia hirasei 
Elysia japonica 
Elysia jaramilloi 
Elysia jibacoaensis 
Elysia kushimotoensis 
Elysia leucolegnote 
Elysia lobata 
Elysia macnaei 
Elysia manriquei 
Elysia maoria 
Elysia marcusi 
Elysia margaritae 
Elysia marginata 
Elysia mercieri 
Elysia minima 
Elysia nealae 
Elysia nigrocapitata 
Elysia nigropunctata 
Elysia nisbeti 
Elysia obtusa 
Elysia oerstedii 
Elysia orientalis 
Elysia ornata 
Elysia papillosa 
Elysia patagonica 
Elysia patina 
Elysia pawliki 
Elysia pilosa 
Elysia pratensis 
Elysia punctata 
Elysia pusilla 
Elysia rubeni 
Elysia rufescens 
Elysia sanfermin 
Elysia serca 
Elysia siamensis 
Elysia singaporensis 
Elysia slimora 
Elysia stylifera 
Elysia subornata 
Elysia sugashimae 
Elysia thompsoni 
Elysia thysanopoda 
Elysia timida 
Elysia tokarensis 
Elysia tomentosa 
Elysia translucens 
Elysia trilobata 
Elysia trisinuata 
Elysia velutinus 
Elysia verrucosa 
Elysia viridis 
Elysia vreelandae 
Elysia yaeyamana 
Elysia zemi 
Elysia zuleicae 

Species brought into synonymy
 Elysia arena Carlson & Hoff, 1978: synonym of Pattyclaya arena (Carlson & Hoff, 1978)
 Elysia bedeckta MacFarland, 1966: synonym of Elysia hedgpethi Er. Marcus, 1961
 Elysia cauze scops Ev. Marcus & Er. Marcus, 1967: synonym of Elysia scops Ev. Marcus & Er. Marcus, 1967
 Elysia gracilis Risbec, 1928: synonym of Thuridilla gracilis (Risbec, 1928)
 Elysia halimedae Macnae, 1954: synonym of Elysia pusilla (Bergh, 1871)
 Elysia picta A. E. Verrill, 1901: synonym of Thuridilla picta (A. E. Verrill, 1901)
 Elysia pruvotfolae Er. Marcus, 1957: synonym of Elysia crispata Mørch, 1863
 Elysia schrammi Mörch, 1863: synonym of Elysia crispata Mørch, 1863
 Elysia splendida Grube, 1861: synonym of Thuridilla hopei (Vérany, 1853)
 Elysia thysanopoda Bergh, 1905: synonym of Thuridilla thysanopoda (Bergh, 1905)
 Elysia vataae Risbec, 1928: synonym of Thuridilla vataae (Risbec, 1928)
 Elysia verrilli Pruvot-Fol, 1946: synonym of Elysia crispata Mørch, 1863
Taxa inquirenda:
 Elysia fezi Vilella, 1968
 Elysia pruvotae Risbec, 1953

References

Further reading 
 Powell A. W. B., New Zealand Mollusca, William Collins Publishers Ltd, Auckland, New Zealand 1979 
 Jensen K.R. (2007) Biogeography of the Sacoglossa (Mollusca, Opisthobranchia). Bonner Zoologische Beiträge 55:255–281
 Händeler K. & Wägele H. (2007) Preliminary study on molecular phylogeny of Sacoglossa and a compilation of their food organisms. Bonner Zoologische Beiträge 55: 231-254.
 http://www.catalogueoflife.org accessed 11 June 2009

External links 
 Video of Elysia diomedea in Costa Rica

Plakobranchidae
Gastropod genera
Taxa named by Antoine Risso